The IIHF Women's World U18 Championship, officially the IIHF Ice Hockey U18 Women's World Championship, is an annual ice hockey tournament for national women's under-18 (U18) ice hockey teams, administrated by the International Ice Hockey Federation (IIHF). It is the junior edition of the IIHF Women's World Championship and participation is limited to female ice hockey players under 18 years of age.

History
A qualification tournament was held in 2007 to finalize divisional placement and the inaugural championship was held in Calgary, Alberta, Canada, in January 2008. The United States' national team were the first champions and have remained the dominant force in the tournament, winning gold at eight of fifteen championships and never ranking lower than third place. The Canadian national team is the only team to have defeated the United States to claim the title, winning seven gold medals in addition to seven silver medals and one bronze. The third most successful team in championship history is the Swedish national team, the only nation to unseat either of the top North American teams to claim silver (2018, 2023) and winners of five bronze medals. The other national teams to have won bronze are the Czech Republic (2), Finland (2), and Russia (3). 

Thirty-two countries participated in the most recent championship (2023) across three divisions: Top Division, Division I, and Division II. As with other IIHF tournaments, there is an active system of promotion and relegation between the groups and divisions, the winner of each group gains promotion to the group or division directly above for the following tournament and the lowest ranking team in relegated to the group or division below. Through this system, no two consecutive championships feature the same teams in each group or division and it is possible for a team to rise from Division IIB to the Top Division or fall from the Top Division to Division IIB in the span of five tournaments – though no team has ever accomplished such a meteoric rise or fall. The Top Division is the only division to confer the title of World Champion and comprises the teams ranked first through eighth in the world. Division I comprises twelve teams organized into two groups of six teams each, classified as Group IA and IB. Division II comprises eight teams organized into two groups of four teams each, classified as Groups IIA and IIB. Winning a gold medal in a divisional tournament below the Top Division corresponds with the numeric placement from first, i.e. the Division IA gold medal team ranks 9th in the world, the Division IB gold medal team ranks 15th in the world, and so on.  

The tournament can be interpreted as the women's counterpart of both the IIHF World U20 Championship and the IIHF World U18 Championship, though it is afforded significantly less in terms of resources or promotion than either of the junior men's tournaments. Media coverage of the women's tournament is similarly lacking in comparison.

List of championships

Participation and medals

References

External links 
 Hockey Canada: 2008 World Women's Under-18 Championship
 IIHF: IIHF World Women's U18 Championship
 IIHF World Women's U18 Championships at EuroHockey.com

 
International ice hockey competitions for junior teams
International Ice Hockey Federation tournaments
Women's ice hockey tournaments
Recurring sporting events established in 2008
January sporting events
Women's U18